Giovanni Mario "John" Castrilli  (born 22 November 1950 in Roccamandolfi, Italy), was a Liberal member of the Western Australian Legislative Assembly representing the electorate of Bunbury after winning the seat in the 2005 election. He retired in 2017.

Early life
Castrilli's father, Antonio, arrived in Australia in 1952 after migrating from Roccamandolfi in Italy, he was joined by the rest of his family in 1954.

Political career
Starting his career in local politics in 1991, Castrilli served as a councillor of the City of Bunbury from 1991 to 1997. Castrilli was then elected as Mayor of Bunbury in 1997 and re-elected in 2001 with a two-party vote of 73.5%.

Contesting the seat of Bunbury for the first time in the 2005 election Castrilli beat the sitting Labor member with a swing of +0.6 points and winning the seat by 0.4 points.

He immediately became a shadow minister under leader Matt Birney, serving in the Local Government and Regional Development shadow portfolio from March 2005 to May 2005.

After the defeat of the Labor government at the 2008 election, he was appointed to the Barnett Ministry and became Minister for Local Government, in which role he handled a controversial proposition to amalgamate smaller local councils.

References

1950 births
Living people
People from the Province of Isernia
Members of the Western Australian Legislative Assembly
Liberal Party of Australia members of the Parliament of Western Australia
People from Bunbury, Western Australia
Australian politicians of Italian descent
People of Molisan descent
Recipients of the Medal of the Order of Australia
21st-century Australian politicians
Mayors of Bunbury, Western Australia
Western Australian local councillors